Certainty is a 2011 American drama film directed by Peter Askin and written by Mike O'Malley, based on his stage play Searching for Certainty.  The cast includes newcomers Tom Lipinski, Adelaide Clemens, Kristen Connolly and Will Rogers alongside veterans Valerie Harper, Bobby Moynihan and Giancarlo Esposito.  The film was produced by Will Battersby, Per Melita and O'Malley.

Synopsis
Certainty tells the story of Dom and Deb who are attending their Pre-Cana engagement encounter weekend, the process a couple must go through in order to get married in the Catholic church.

Production
Filming began on May 24, 2010, in New York City.

Release
Certainty premiered on September 16, 2011, at the Boston Film Festival, where it won awards for Best Screenplay, Best Editing, and Best Ensemble Cast. It was also shown at the Sarasota Film Festival and the Nantucket Film Festival, as well as festivals in New Hampshire and Long Beach.

It was released theatrically and digitally at the end of November 2012 by FilmBuff.

References

External links
 
 
 
 

2011 films
2011 drama films
2011 independent films
2010s American films
2010s English-language films
American drama films
American films based on plays
American independent films
Films about Catholicism
Films about weddings in the United States
Films directed by Peter Askin
Films scored by David Mansfield
Films shot in New York City